Peggy Blackford (born 1942) was the American Ambassador to Guinea-Bissau from 1995 until relations were suspended in June 1998 and she fled to Senegal to escape the rebellion in Guinea-Bissau.

Born in Trenton, New Jersey, Blackford was raised in nearby Ewing Township, New Jersey and attended Ewing High School.

Blackford graduated from Syracuse University in 1963.

References

1942 births
Ambassadors of the United States to Guinea-Bissau
American women ambassadors
Ambassadors of the United States
Ewing High School (New Jersey) alumni
People from Ewing Township, New Jersey
People from Trenton, New Jersey
Syracuse University alumni
Living people
20th-century American diplomats
20th-century American women
21st-century American women